The 1998 Las Vegas Bowl was the seventh edition of the annual college football bowl game. It featured the San Diego State Aztecs, and the North Carolina Tar Heels. It remains the only bowl game in NCAA history where both of teams which participated in it started the season 0–3.

Game summary
San Diego State scored first after receiver Lonny Mitchell recovered a San Diego State fumble and advanced it 60 yards for a touchdown, putting the Aztecs up 7-0. North Carolina got back into the game with field goals of 32 and 23 yards from Josh McGee, to pull the Tar Heels to within 7-6. Quarterback Ronald Curry took off on a 48-yard touchdown run, but a missed extra point left the score at 12-7, North Carolina.

In the second quarter, safety David Bomar recovered a blocked punt in the end zone for a touchdown, and a two-point conversion made the score 20-7 North Carolina. North Carolina would not score for the rest of the game. Before halftime, Nate Tandberg kicked a 32-yard field goal to pull SDSU to within 20-10. Later in the fourth quarter, he drilled another 38-yard field goal, to make it 20-13 UNC. North Carolina would hold on to win the game by that margin.

References

External links
 Review of game by USA Today

Las Vegas Bowl
Las Vegas Bowl
North Carolina Tar Heels football bowl games
San Diego State Aztecs football bowl games
Las Vegas Bowl
December 1998 sports events in the United States